Ümraniyespor Kulübü is a Turkish professional football club located in Ümraniye, Istanbul.

The club plays in red and white kits, and have done so since their formation in 1938. They have secured promotion to Süper Lig for their first time 3 weeks before the end of 2021- 22 season, after defeating Balıkesirspor 4-1 on May 1st, 2022.

Stadium
Currently the team plays at the 1,600 capacity Ümraniye Belediyesi Şehir Stadium.

Players

Current squad

Out on loan

Honours
 TFF First League
 Runner-up: 2021–22
 TFF Second League 
 Winner: 2015–16
 TFF Third League 
 Winner: 2013–14
 Turkish Regional Amateur League 
 Winner: 2010–11

League participations  
Süper Lig: 2022-
TFF First League: 2016–2022
TFF Second League: 2014–2016
TFF Third League:  1984–1987, 1990–1993, 1999–2000, 2011–2014
Turkish Regional Amateur League: 1993–1995, 2010–2011
Amatör Futbol Ligleri: 1938–1984, 1987–1990, 1995–1999, 2000–2010

References

External links
Official website
Ümraniyespor on TFF.org

Ümraniyespor
Football clubs in Turkey
Association football clubs established in 1938